The Adventures of Frank Merriwell first ran on NBC radio from March 26 to June 22, 1934 as a 15-minute serial airing three times a week at 5:30 pm. Sponsored by Dr. West's Toothpaste, this program starred Donald Briggs as Frank Merriwell. Harlow Wilcox was the announcer.

After a 12-year gap, the series returned October 5, 1946 as a 30-minute NBC Saturday morning show, continuing until June 4, 1949. Lawson Zerbe (1914–1992) starred as Merriwell, Jean Gillespie and Elaine Rostas as Inza Burrage, Harold Studer as Bart Hodge and Patricia Hosley as Elsie Belwood. Announcers were Mel Brandt and Harlow Wilcox, and the Paul Taubman Orchestra supplied the background music.

See also
 The Adventures of Frank Merriwell (serial)

References

American radio dramas
1930s American radio programs
1940s American radio programs